Jules White (born Julius Weiss; ; 17 September 190030 April 1985) was a Hungarian-American film director and producer best known for his short-subject comedies starring The Three Stooges.

Early years 
White began working in motion pictures in the 1910s, as a child actor, for Pathé Studios. He appears in a small role as a Confederate soldier in the landmark silent feature The Birth of a Nation (1915). By the 1920s his brother Jack White had become a successful comedy producer at Educational Pictures, and Jules worked for him as a film editor. Jules became a director in 1926, specializing in comedies such as The Battling Kangaroo (1926).

In 1930 White and his boyhood friend Zion Myers moved to the Metro-Goldwyn-Mayer studio. They conceived and co-directed M-G-M's gimmicky Dogville Comedies, which featured trained dogs in satires of recent Hollywood films (like The Dogway Melody and So Quiet on the Canine Front). White and Myers co-directed the Buster Keaton feature Sidewalks of New York (1931), and launched a series of "Goofy Movies," one-reel parodies of silent-era melodramas.

Columbia Pictures 
In 1933, Jules White was appointed head of Columbia Pictures' short-subject division, which became the most prolific comedy factory in Hollywood. In a time when theaters were playing more double-feature programs, fewer short comedies were being made; by the mid-1930s the three major comedy producers — Hal Roach, Educational Pictures and Universal Pictures — scaled back their operations. In contrast, by 1938 Columbia's two-reel-comedy department was busier than ever, and White split it into two units. White produced for the first unit and Hugh McCollum (former executive secretary for Columbia head Harry Cohn) for the second. The Columbia comedy stars alternated between the White and McCollum units.
With McCollum shouldering some of the administrative burden, White was free to pursue his first love: directing. He began directing the Columbia shorts in 1938 and would become the department's most prolific director. He directed his sound films as though they were silent comedies: he paced the visual action very fast, and he coached his actors to gesture broadly and react painfully, even demonstrating the movements and grimaces he wanted. This emphasis on cartoonish slapstick worked well in the right context, but could become blunt and shocking when stretched too far. White was generally under pressure to finish his productions within a few days, so very often White the producer did not tone down White the director, and the outlandishly violent gags stayed in. Still, moviegoers loved these slam-bang short comedies, and Columbia produced more than 500 of them over a quarter-century.

Directorial style 
Physical comedy was the main ingredient in  White's short features. Some of his personal favorite gags were used repeatedly over the years: a comedian being arrested protests, "I demand a cheap lawyer!" (later "I'm gonna get myself a cheap lawyer!"). Or the star comedian accidentally collides with the villain and apologizes, "Sorry, mister, there was a man chasing me... you're the man!" White's most familiar gag is probably the one where an actor is stuck in the posterior by a sharp object, and then yells, "Help, help! I'm losing my mind!"

White's style is most evident in his string of two-reelers starring comics Wally Vernon and Eddie Quillan. Vernon and Quillan were old pros whose dancing skills made them especially agile comedians. White capitalized on this by staging the kind of rough-and-tumble slapstick not seen since silent-movie days, with the stars and supporting players doing pratfalls, crossing their eyes, getting hit with messy projectiles, having barehanded fistfights and being knocked "cuckoo" in film after film. These comedies were pet projects for White: he kept making Vernon and Quillan shorts long after most of his other series had ended.

Later films 
By the 1950s, White was working so quickly and economically that he could film a new short comedy in a single day. His standard procedure was to borrow footage from older films and shoot a few new scenes, often using the same actors, sets, and costumes. A "new" 15-minute comedy could contain clips from as many as three vintage comedies. Though most of White's comedies of the 1950s are almost identical to his comedies of the 1940s, he still made a few films from scratch, including three 3-D comedies, Spooks! and Pardon My Backfire (1953), both starring The Three Stooges, and Down the Hatch, starring dialect comic Harry Mimmo. 

In 1956, after other studios had abandoned short-subject production, Jules White had the field to himself and experimented with new ideas. Many of his Stooge comedies now consisted of all-new material, featuring science-fiction or musical themes, and often including topical references to rock and roll and then-current feature films. White even launched a new series, "Girlie Whirls," as musical-comedy vehicles for plump comedian Muriel Landers; only one film was made before White reassigned her to one of the Stooge comedies.

Retirement and death 
Jules White decided to retire at the end of 1957, and closed Columbia's comedy-shorts department. White dabbled in television at Columbia's Screen Gems subsidiary in the early 1960s, creating the 1962 situation comedy Oh! Those Bells with the Wiere Brothers, and co-producing its pilot episode with his brother Sam White, but soon retired, saying, "Who needs such a rat race?" 

Almost 40% of White's output stars The Three Stooges; the other films feature such screen favorites as Buster Keaton, Andy Clyde, Harry Langdon, Hugh Herbert, Vera Vague, Gus Schilling and Richard Lane, and El Brendel. To date, only the Stooges, Charley Chase, and Keaton series have been released to DVD in their entirety; other comedies (Andy Clyde, The Glove Slingers) have been included as bonus features on DVDs.

White died of Alzheimer's disease on April 30, 1985. His interment was at Hollywood Forever Cemetery.

Filmography

References

Further reading

External links 
 
 
 Jules White – The Three Stooges

1900 births
1985 deaths
20th-century American comedians
20th-century American Jews
20th-century American male actors
American film directors
American male child actors
American people of Hungarian-Jewish descent
Deaths from Alzheimer's disease
Deaths from dementia in California
Hungarian Jews
Hungarian emigrants to the United States
Jewish American male actors
Male actors from Budapest